Justin Cicatello (born March 6, 1984) is a  professional baseball pitcher, who is currently with Parma Baseball in the Italian Baseball League.

He played amateur baseball at Kenmore West Senior High School, Florida State College at Jacksonville and the University of Pittsburgh.

He was not selected by any Major League clubs so he signed with the Kalamazoo Kings of the Frontier League in 2007. In 2010, he joined the Italian Baseball League's Parma club after a brief period in Serie A2.

He was on the roster for the Italy national baseball team at the 2013 World Baseball Classic. He currently pitches for the Toronto Maple Leafs of the Intercounty Baseball League based out of Southern Ontario(www.theibl.ca)

References

External links

1984 births
Baseball pitchers
Living people
2013 World Baseball Classic players
Kalamazoo Kings players